Finn Dominik Porath (born 23 February 1997) is a German professional footballer who plays as a left midfielder for  club Holstein Kiel.

References

External links
 

Living people
1997 births
People from Eutin
Footballers from Schleswig-Holstein
German footballers
Association football midfielders
Bundesliga players
2. Bundesliga players
3. Liga players
Regionalliga players
Hamburger SV II players
Hamburger SV players
SpVgg Unterhaching players
Holstein Kiel players